Castle Hill railway station is an underground rapid transit station built by the Metro Trains Sydney consortium at Old Castle Hill Road, Castle Hill, in Sydney, Australia. The station, located opposite the Castle Towers shopping centre, was built as part of Transport for NSW's Sydney Metro Northwest project, to serve train services to Rouse Hill and Chatswood. The station is planned to eventually serve trains to the Sydney central business district and Bankstown as part of the government's 20-year Sydney's Rail Future strategy.

History

The NSW Government announced a future railway line from Epping to Castle Hill as part of its Action for Public Transport strategy in 1998. In the years that followed, Castle Hill Station formed part of successive north-western rail proposals, including the Metropolitan Rail Expansion Plan in 2005 and a short-lived metro proposal in 2008.

Work on the North West Rail Link got underway with the election of the O'Farrell Government in 2011. The new station was opened to passengers 26 May 2019. The station is operated by Metro Trains Sydney which was also responsible for the design of the station as part of its Operations, Trains and Systems contract with Transport for NSW.

The underground pedestrian tunnel to Castle Towers opened on 5 December 2019 in conjunction with the mall's expansion.

Services
Castle Hill has two platforms and two crossovers, which can be used to terminate westbound trains on either platform if there is a problem on the line. It is served by Metro North West Line services. Castle Hill station is served by a number of bus routes operated by Busways and Hillsbus.

References

External links

 Castle Hill Station description at Sydney Metro Northwest project website
 Northwest Rapid Transit corporate website
 Castle Hill Station details Transport for New South Wales  (Archived 17 June 2019)

Easy Access railway stations in Sydney
Sydney Metro stations
Railway stations in Australia opened in 2019
Castle Hill, New South Wales
The Hills Shire